The Cape clapper lark (Mirafra apiata) is a small passerine bird which breeds in southern Africa. It derives its name from the wing clapping which forms part of the display flight. The Cape clapper lark is a species of open grassland and savannah, also inhabiting karoo, fynbos and fallow agricultural land.

Taxonomy and systematics
The Cape clapper lark was originally placed in the genus Alauda. This species and the Eastern clapper lark were formerly considered conspecific as the clapper lark (M. apiata) until split in 2009. The Cape clapper lark and the Eastern clapper lark are regarded as forming a superspecies with the flappet lark, which is found further to the north. Bar-tailed lark is another alternate name for the Cape clapper lark.

Subspecies 
Two subspecies are recognized: 
 M. a. apiata - (Vieillot, 1816): Found in south-western Namibia and western South Africa
 Agulhas clapper lark (M. a. marjoriae) - Winterbottom, 1956: Found in southern Western Cape Province, South Africa as far east as Knysna.

Description 
This lark is a 15 cm long bird, with a brown crown, rich rufous underparts, and a strong bill. The Cape clapper lark has grey upperparts and a grey face, and the Agulhas clapper lark has dark brown upperparts, although individual variation means that it cannot always be reliably distinguished from the nominate race.

The display commences with an ascending flight with wing flapping. The Cape clapper lark has a slower wing clap compared to the Eastern clapper lark, and its otherwise similar call is longer and rises in pitch more. The Agulhas clapper lark has a fast wing clap, and a descending double whistled "peeeooo" call.

Behaviour 
The Cape clapper lark is a skulking species and difficult to find when not displaying. It is not gregarious, and individuals tend to be seen in dry habitats feeding on the ground on seeds and insects.

References 

Sinclair, Hockey and Tarboton, SASOL Birds of Southern Africa,

External links

Species text - The Atlas of Southern African Birds

Cape clapper lark
Birds of Southern Africa
Cape clapper lark
Taxa named by Louis Jean Pierre Vieillot